Gatford is a surname. Notable people with the surname include:

Ian Gatford (born 1940), British Anglican clergyman
 Lionel Gatford (priest, died 1665), royalist Church of England clergyman
 Lionel Gatford (priest, died 1715), English Anglican priest, Archdeacon of St Albans

See also
Gafford (disambiguation)